The 1924 International Lawn Tennis Challenge was the 19th edition of what is now known as the Davis Cup. The tournament was, for the second straight year, divided into the America and Europe Zones. 17 teams competed in the Europe Zone, and 6 in America. China, Cuba, Hungary, Mexico, and New Zealand all competed for the first time, and South Africa and Austria returned to create the largest field to date.

For the second straight year, Australia defeated France in the Inter-Zonal play-off, but once again fell to the United States in the challenge round. The final was played at the Germantown Cricket Club in Philadelphia, Pennsylvania, United States on 11–13 September.

America Zone

Draw

Final
Australia vs. Japan

Europe Zone

Draw

Final
France vs. Czechoslovakia

Inter-Zonal Final
Australia vs. France

Challenge Round
United States vs. Australia

See also
 1924 Wightman Cup

References

External links
Davis Cup official website

Davis Cups by year
 
International Lawn Tennis Challenge
International Lawn Tennis Challenge
International Lawn Tennis Challenge